Chilo argyrogramma is a moth in the family Crambidae. It was described by George Hampson in 1919. It is found in Kenya.

References

Endemic moths of Kenya
Chiloini
Moths described in 1919